Stefan Shalamanov (born 27 January 1970) is a Bulgarian alpine skier. He competed in two events at the 1988 Winter Olympics.

References

1970 births
Living people
Bulgarian male alpine skiers
Olympic alpine skiers of Bulgaria
Alpine skiers at the 1988 Winter Olympics
Sportspeople from Sofia